"Halle Berry (She's Fine)" is the lead single by American rapper Hurricane Chris from his second studio album, Unleashed, The hip-hop song features guest appearances from a local rapper, named SVPA (formally known as Superstarr). The song was produced also by SVPA, along with Play-N-Skillz and Q Smith. The song originally belonged to SVPA who was signed to Play-N-Skillz who sold the song to Hurricane Chris.

Music video
The music video was released on April 29, 2009. The music video features a cameo appearance by a video vixen, named Ajia Nicole (who is a female model from Dallas, Texas).

Track listing
 CD single
 "Halle Berry (She's Fine)" (featuring Superstarr) (Clean Version) – 4:50
 "Halle Berry (She's Fine)" (featuring Superstarr) (Dirty Version) – 4:41
 "Halle Berry (She's Fine)" (Instrumental) – 4:48

Remixes
The remix to "Halle Berry (She's Fine)" was released, which features guest vocals from rappers to musicians; including Superstarr, Ludacris, Beenie Man, Lil Boosie, Yo Gotti, Pitbull, Yung Joc and C-Ride. The remix was mixed, and edited by Edwin Solano at the recording studios of JAMBOX Entertainment in midtown Manhattan, New York City.

Charts

Weekly charts

Year-end charts

References 

Songs about actors
2008 songs
2009 singles
Hurricane Chris (rapper) songs
Song recordings produced by Play-N-Skillz